San Juan Bautista Tuxtepec ("on the hill of rabbits"), or simply referred to as Tuxtepec, is the head of the municipality by the same name and is the second most populous city of the Mexican state of Oaxaca.
It is part of the Tuxtepec District of the Papaloapan Region.
As of the 2020 census, the city is home to a population of 103,609 and 159,452 in the municipality (0.979% of the state population), though census data are often under reported for various reasons. The city itself is surrounded by the Papaloapan River, and lies a few kilometers south of the Cerro de Oro Dam on its tributary the Santo Domingo River.
The municipality is bordered by the state of Veracruz in the north, the municipalities of Loma Bonita to the east and San José Chiltepec to the south.

Municipality

The city serves as municipal seat of the municipality, having jurisdiction over the following communities:

Adolfina Rangel Arceo, Agua Azul, Agua Escondida, Agua Fría Papaloapan, Agua Fría Piedra del Sol, Amapa, Arroyo Chiquito, Arroyo Cohapa, Arroyo Limón, Arroyo Zuzule, Atilano Cruz, Base Estrella, Benemérito Juárez, Bethania, Buenavista, Buenavista Gallardo, Buenavista Río Tonto, Buenos Aires el Apompo, California, Camalotal, Camarón Salsipuedes, Camelia Roja, Campo Nuevo, Canutillo, Caracol, Cándido Cuevas, Centro de Población Rosario Ibarra de Piedra, Cerro Bola, Claudio Vicente Justo, Colonia la Fe, Colonia Mancilla y Acevedo, Colonia Obrera (Ejido Benito Juárez), Colonia Obrera Benito Juárez, Colonia Ortega, Colonia Víctor Bravo Ahuja (Segunda Etapa), Conjunto Residencial Fapatux, Conjunto Residencial Sebastopol, Curva las Consuegras (Ejido las Ánimas), Desviación Piedra Quemada, Don Juan (San Antonio), Dos Caminos, El Azufre, El Basurero Municipal, El Cañaveral, El Caminante, El Cedral, El Chaparral, El Crucero, El Desengaño, El Encajonado, El Escobillal, El Esfuerzo, El Guayabo (Boca de Coapa), El Jimbal, El Mangal, El Milagro, El Mirador Mata de Caña (Lino Ramírez), El Naranjal, El Ojillal (Boca de Coapa), El Palmar, El Panalito, El Paraíso, El Paraíso Zacatal, El Peal, El Placer, El Porvenir, El Progreso 1, El Progreso 2, El Recreo 1, El Recreo 2, El Recreo 3, El Recuerdo, El Suspiro, El Tonto, El Triunfo, El Yagual, El Zapotal, Esperanza Arroyo la Gloria, Finca el Progreso, Francisco I. Madero (Los Cerritos), Francisco I. Madero de los Cerritos Río Tonto, Frente al Ingenio, Fuente Misteriosa, Fuente Villa, Galera de Soto, General Lázaro Cárdenas, Huerta San Gerardo, Ignacio Zaragoza, Jazmín, Jimaguas, La Aurora y Anexas, La Carlota, La Coconal (Desviación  Agua Fría), La Esmalta, La Esmeralda, La Esperanza, La Esperanza Agua Pescadito, La Huerta, La Hulera, La Mina, La Montaña, La Nueva Revolución, La Pequeña, La Pita (Efrén Garduño), La Pita (El Mexicanito), La Pochota, La Puerta del Recreo, La Redonda (Boca de Coapa), La Reforma, La Trinidad, La Unión, Las Delicias, Las Palmas, Las Palmas (El Nanche), Las Palomas, Lic. Ignacio Martínez Bautista, Los Anzures, Los Ávalos, Los Ávalos, Los Cocos, Los Juanes, Los Mangales (La Estopa), Los Mangos, Los Pinos, Los Reyes (Ampliación Santa Úrsula), Macín Chico, María Domínguez, Mata de Caña, Mixtancillo (Boca de Coapa), Mundo Nuevo, Nuevo Horizonte, Ojo de Agua, Palmilla, Pantoja, Papaloapan, Paso Canoa, Paso de Armadillo, Paso Rincón, Piedra Quemada, Pillo García (Buenavista), Pio V Becerra Ballesteros, Playa del Mono, Pueblo Nuevo Ojo de Agua, Pueblo Nuevo Papaloapan, Puente del Obispo (La Joya), Rancho de San Antonio 1, Rancho de San Antonio 2, Rancho Doña Mimí, Rancho el Águila, Rancho el Sábalo, Rancho Mis Abuelos, Rancho Nuevo Jonotal, Rincón Bonito, Roberto Figueroa, Rodeo Arroyo Pepesca, Sabino Pérez, San Bartolo, San Felipe de la Peña, San Fermín, San Francisco 1, San Francisco 2, San Francisco Salsipuedes, San Isidro las Piñas, San José, San Juan Bautista de Matamoros, San Juan Bautista Tuxtepec, San Lorenzo (El Zapotal), San Martín las Caobas, San Miguel Obispo, San Pedro, San Rafael 1, San Rafael 2, San Román, San Rosendo, San Silverio el Cedral, Santa Úrsula, Santa Catarina, Santa Elena, Santa Isabel Río Obispo, Santa María Amapa, Santa María Obispo, Santa Rosa Papaloapan, Santa Silvia, Santa Teresa (Boca de Coapa), Santa Teresa Papaloapan, Santo Tomás, Sebastopol, Silvano Reyes, Silverio la Arrocera, Soledad Macín Chico, Tacoteno el Consuelo, Tecoteno el Tular, Toro Bravo, Vista Hermosa, and Zacate Colorado

Together, the municipality covers an area of 933.9 km² (360.58 sq mi) and reported a census population of 144,555, which includes many small outlying communities.

History

Municipal President Fernando Bautista Dávila died in 2020 during the COVID-19 pandemic in Mexico.

Climate

Twinned towns
 Tierra Blanca, Mexico
 Tlacotalpan, Mexico

See also
Plan de Tuxtepec, proclaimed on 10 January 1876

References

External links

Gobierno Municipal de San Juan Bautista Tuxtepec Official website

Municipalities of Oaxaca